Willie Spence (June 18, 1999 – October 11, 2022) was an American singer. He was the runner-up of the nineteenth season of American Idol at the age of 22.

Life
Spence was born on June 18, 1999, in West Palm Beach, Florida, and grew up in Douglas, Georgia, after his family moved there.

Spence posted online videos of him singing during his time in high school. In 2017, a video he had posted singing the Rihanna song "Diamonds" went viral on YouTube, eventually garnering over 15 million views. This brought him significant attention, including an appearance on the talk show Steve, hosted by Steve Harvey. In 2021, Spence auditioned for season 19 of American Idol. His performances received a positive reception from the judges, and Spence ended up placing second in the competition, only behind Chayce Beckham.

Death
Spence was killed in a car crash on Interstate 24 near Chattanooga on October 11, 2022 at 23 years old. His death was reported by the Marion County Sheriff's Office. According to WSB-TV in Atlanta, he was driving a Jeep Cherokee when he veered off I-24 at around 4:00PM ET. His vehicle struck a car that was stopped on the shoulder of the road. The driver of that vehicle was not injured.

The official Instagram account for American Idol reposted a video of Spence's audition for the show as a tribute. Beckham and Katharine McPhee, a contestant on the show's fifth season who had previously performed with Spence, posted their own tributes to Spence on Instagram.

Spence is the fifth American Idol finalist to die after Michael Johns in 2014, Rickey Smith in 2016, Leah LaBelle in 2018, and Nikki McKibbin in 2020.

References 

1999 births
2022 deaths
21st-century American male singers
21st-century American singers
21st-century African-American singers
American Idol participants
People from Douglas, Georgia
People from West Palm Beach, Florida
Road incident deaths in Tennessee
Singers from Florida